The 2015 Saint Paul City Council elections will be held on November 3, 2015, to elect the 7 members of the Saint Paul City Council for four-year terms. Members will be elected from single-member districts via instant-runoff voting, popularly known as ranked choice voting. Voters will have the option of ranking candidates.

Municipal elections in Minnesota are nonpartisan, although candidates were able to identify with a political party on the ballot.

Results
Names of incumbents are italicized.

Ward 1

Candidates

Ward 2

Candidates

Ward 3

Candidates

Ward 4

Candidates

Ward 5

Candidates

Ward 6

Candidates

Ward 7

Candidates
Jane Prince

See also
 Saint Paul City Council
 Saint Paul mayoral election, 2013

References

External links
 Ramsey County Elections
 Elections & Voting - Minnesota Secretary of State
 Saint Paul Issues Forum Election Discussion

Minneapolis–Saint Paul
History of Saint Paul, Minnesota
Local elections in Minnesota
2015 Minnesota elections
2015 in Minnesota
Government of Saint Paul, Minnesota